Andrea Paola Peralta Delgado (born 9 May 1988) is a Colombian professional footballer who plays as a midfielder for Independiente Santa Fe. She has been a member of the Colombia women's national team. She was part of the team at the 2011 FIFA Women's World Cup. On club level she plays for Club Deportivo Estudiantes F.C. in Colombia.

References

External links
 

1988 births
Living people
Place of birth missing (living people)
Colombian women's footballers
Women's association football midfielders
Women's association football defenders
Atlético Huila footballers
Grêmio Osasco Audax Esporte Clube players
Campeonato Brasileiro de Futebol Feminino Série A1 players
Colombia women's international footballers
2011 FIFA Women's World Cup players
Colombian expatriate women's footballers
Colombian expatriate sportspeople in Brazil
Expatriate women's footballers in Brazil
21st-century Colombian women